The 2003–04 season is the 35th season of competitive association football in Australia.
Association football in Australia.

National teams

Australia national soccer team

Friendlies

Australia women's national soccer team

2003 FIFA Women's World Cup

2004 Australia Cup

2004 OFC Women's Olympic Qualifying Tournament

Men's football

National Soccer League

Source:

Women's football

National Soccer League

References

Australian soccer by year
Seasons in Australian soccer